Pierre Baudin (21 August 1863 in Nantua – 30 July 1917 in Paris) was a French radical-socialist politician.

Sources
http://www.senat.fr/senateur-3eme-republique/baudin_pierre0016r3.html

French Naval Ministers
1863 births
1917 deaths